Fabian Wagner (born 25 April 1978) is a German cinematographer. His roles in the production of the television shows Sherlock and Game of Thrones have earned him two Creative Arts Emmy Award nominations. In 2017 and 2020 respectively, he won the American Society of Cinematographers Award for Outstanding Achievement in Cinematography in Regular Series for his work on the Game of Thrones episode "Battle of the Bastards" and for his work on season 3 of The Crown.

Life and career 
Fabian Wagner was born in Munich, Germany. He studied at the Northern Film School in Leeds, earning a master's degree. Starting in 2004, Wagner began working as a cinematographer, first shooting music videos and short films. In 2008, he began working regularly on television shows for BBC and ITV, and since then has been working almost exclusively for British and American film companies. His first role as a cinematographer for a TV show was for the 2008 BBC Three drama series Spooks: Code 9, for which he filmed all six episodes. Since then he has been working all across the world on various productions. His first feature film The Legend of Barney Thomson (2015) under director Robert Carlyle won the Scottish Bafta award for best movie. His work on the Sherlock episode "A Scandal in Belgravia" and the Game of Thrones episode "Hardhome" earned him two Emmy nominations in 2012 and 2015, respectively. He has also been nominated for ASC and BSC awards and has become one of the youngest members of the British Society of Cinematographers.

Filmography

Film

Television

Accolades

References

External links 

German cinematographers
1978 births
Film people from Munich
Living people
Alumni of the Northern Film School